Jamtara Assembly constituency is an assembly constituency in  the Indian state of Jharkhand.

Overview
Jamtara Assembly constituency covers: Jamtara Police Station (excluding Karmatanr, Sahajpur, Pindari, Lakhanpur, Rataniya, Rampurbhitra and Kajra gram panchayats) and Narayanpur Police Station in Jamtara district.

Jamtara Assembly constituency is part of Dumka (Lok Sabha constituency).

Members of Legislative Assembly 
1995: Furqan Ansari, Indian National Congress
2000: Furkan Ansari, Indian National Congress
2005: Bishnu Prasad Bhaiya, Bharatiya Janata Party
2009: Bishnu Prasad Bhaiya, Jharkhand Mukti Morcha
2009: Shibu Soren, Jharkhand Mukti Morcha By Polls
2014: Irfan Ansari, Indian National Congress
2019: Irfan Ansari, Indian National Congress

See also
Jamtara block
Narayanpur block
List of states of India by type of legislature

References

Assembly constituencies of Jharkhand
Jamtara district